This is a list of roads in Taiwan.

Taipei City
 Civic Boulevard
 Dihua Street
 Dunhua Road
 Fuxing Road
 Guangfu Road
 Heping Road
 Jianguo Road
 Keelung Road
 Ketagalan Boulevard
 Minsheng Road
 Nanjing Road
 Renai Road
 Roosevelt Road
 Xinsheng Road
 Xinyi Road
 Zhongshan Road
 Zhongxiao Road

New Taipei City
 Sanxia Old Street
 Shenkeng Old Street
 Tamsui Old Street
 Wulai Old Street

Taichung City
 Yizhong Street

Tainan City
 Anping Old Street
 Ciaonan Street
 Xinhua Old Street

Kaohsiung City
 Sanfong Central Street

Chiayi County
 Fenchihu Old Street

Kinmen County
 Boyu Road
 Mofan Street

Penghu County
 Central Street (Taiwan)

Taoyuan County
 Daxi Old Street

Yilan County
 Toucheng Old Street

See also

 Transportation in Taiwan
 Highway system in Taiwan

References

Taiwan transport-related lists
 
Taiwan
Roads